"Star 69" is a song from the R.E.M. album Monster. It was not released as an official single but still reached No. 74 on the US Billboard Hot 100 Airplay chart.

Critical reception
Chuck Campbell from Knoxville News Sentinel felt that Michael Stipe's "echoing vocals swarm out of the churning punk vivacity" of "Star 69". Rob Jones called the track a "return-to-roots glam punk anthem".

Background
The song is named after the access number for the last-call return feature of telephones in North America, as indicated by its chorus:
"I know you called
I know you called
I know you hung up my line
Star 69"

Of all of the songs on Monster, "Star 69" is the one that evolved most from its initial demo.  It started out at six minutes long before having its bridge excised and its original chorus discarded.

"Star 69" was frequently played live throughout the tours in support of Monster and their 1998 release Up but from 2003 to 2008 was only ever sporadically performed.

Charts

References

R.E.M. songs
1994 songs
Songs written by Bill Berry
Songs written by Peter Buck
Songs written by Mike Mills
Songs written by Michael Stipe
Song recordings produced by Scott Litt
Song recordings produced by Michael Stipe
Song recordings produced by Mike Mills
Song recordings produced by Peter Buck
Song recordings produced by Bill Berry
Music videos directed by Jonathan Dayton and Valerie Faris
Grunge songs
American hard rock songs
Songs about telephone calls
American garage rock songs
Glam punk songs